Patthe Bapurao (11 November 1868 – 22 December 1941) was a Marathi singer-poet in the Tamasha musical theatre genre. He also composed severals Vags, dramatic and humorous skits, which were also popular.

Biography 
Born on 11 November 1868, (at Rethareharnax, Sangli, Maharashtra)  as Shridhar Balkrishna Kulkarni in a typical Maharashtrian Brahmin family, he married the Beautiful Laavani Dancer Pawala and became one of the most popular performers of early 20th century. His wife, Pawala Bai was from Hivargao Pavsa in Sanganmener.

शासनाने प्रस्तावाला मंजुरी देण्याची मागणी.) In his memory, Patthe Bapurao Street is a name given to a street in Redlight area of South Mumbai (Falkland Road, Foras road near Alfred cinema). A movie has been made after him, and several streets are named for him in Mumbai and other Indian cities.
The name is also written Bapurav.

He died on 22 December 1941.

References 

Marathi-language poets
1868 births
1941 deaths
Indian male folk singers
Marathi-language singers
Indian male musical theatre actors
19th-century Indian male singers
20th-century Indian male singers
20th-century Indian singers
19th-century Indian poets
Indian male poets
Singers from Maharashtra
Poets from Maharashtra
19th-century Indian male writers